Afreen Fatima is an Indian student leader and National Secretary of Fraternity Movement by Jamaat-e-Islami. She is a prominent Muslim voice against the anti-Muslim policies of the Indian government.

She is pursuing MA in linguistics at JNU, where she also serves as the elected councillor in JNU students' union 2019-20 from the school of Language, Literature and Cultural Studies. As a candidate from Fraternity Movement - BAPSA alliance, she strengthened the call of "unity of the oppressed" and raised the issues of representation, discrimination and identity assertion. Formerly, she has been the elected president of Women's College Students' Union at the Aligarh Muslim University for the session 2018-19. She is known to have actively participated in the anti-CAA protests that started in 2019. She faced several days long media trial after a small part of her speech was tweeted by BJP's national spokesman Sambit Patra.
In June 2022 Afrin's house was demolished by the authorities in Prayag Raj after he was accused of taking part in violent protests against an insulting comment by Nupur Sharma.

In June 2022 Afreen's house was demolished by the authorities in Prayag Raj after he was accused of taking part in violent protests against an insulting comment by Nupur Sharma.

References

Living people
Indian Muslim activists
Jawaharlal Nehru University alumni
Jawaharlal Nehru University Students' Union
Aligarh Muslim University alumni
Year of birth missing (living people)